Aleksandr Kolmakov (born 12 December 1966) is a Kazakhstani ski jumper. He competed at the 1994 Winter Olympics and the 1998 Winter Olympics.

References

1966 births
Living people
Kazakhstani male ski jumpers
Olympic ski jumpers of Kazakhstan
Ski jumpers at the 1994 Winter Olympics
Ski jumpers at the 1998 Winter Olympics
Place of birth missing (living people)